Datsun 280 ZZZAP, also known as Midnight Racer or 280 ZZZAP, is a 1976 arcade racing video game released by Midway Manufacturing, designed by Jamie Fenton. Based on Nissan's Datsun 280Z, it is one of the earliest games with authorized branding. An unbranded version was released as Midnight Racer, originally in November 1976. The branded version Datsun 280 ZZZAP was then released in Japan by Taito in February 1977, and then in North America by Midway in March 1977.

Gameplay
The title was named after the US advertising campaign for Nissan's Datsun 280Z. Players can drive up to  while navigating a tricky road course at night. Players must watch out for treacherous turns, nasty competitors, and the ever-present time limit.

Release
Midway demonstrated Midnight Racer at the AMOA show in November 1976. It drew comparisons to Night Driver, demonstrated at the same show by Atari, Inc. In turn, both games drew comparisons to an earlier German night driving video game (Nürburgring 1) demonstrated at the German IMA show in Spring 1976. The branded version Datsun 280 ZZZAP was later released in Japan by Taito in February 1977, and then in North America by Midway in March 1977.

Reception
On the US Play Meter arcade chart, 280 ZZZAP was the year's ninth highest-grossing arcade game of 1977. On the US RePlay arcade chart, it was the tenth highest-grossing arcade video game of 1977. On Japan's Game Machine arcade chart, it was among the top 20 highest-grossing arcade video games of 1977.

References

1976 video games
Advergames
Arcade video games
Arcade-only video games
Midway video games
North America-exclusive video games
Racing video games
Video games developed in the United States
280 ZZZAP